Galloways may refer to:
 Galloway's Society for the Blind, charity in Lancashire, England
 Galloways Bakers, chain of pie shops in North West England
 W & J Galloway & Sons, known from 1931 as Galloways Ltd, maker of steam engines and boilers based in Manchester, England

See also
Galloway (disambiguation)